Santa Claws (also known as 'Tis the Season) is a 1996 slasher film written and directed by John A. Russo. It stars Debbie Rochon as a scream queen B-movie actress who is stalked by an obsessed fan. The film gives an insider's view of the challenges that actors and actresses face about violent stalker fans and describes the downside of fame.

Plot
The story is about a horror movie actress named Raven Quinn (Debbie Rochon). After her marriage crumbles down, she wins the custody of her daughters and raises them alone. She feels fortunate that she finds a good neighbor named Wayne (Grant Kramer), who provides a much needed emotional support and agrees to baby-sit her two young daughters.
 
Little does Raven know that Wayne has had his share of murders while growing up and has now set his eyes to stalk her. Wayne has an altar that is full of Raven's pictures and a mannequin resembling Raven in his house.

Wayne feels cheated that Raven's co-workers are sharing her attention. Feeling jealous, Wayne murders Raven's co-stars one by one while dressed in a Santa Claus costume. His weapon of choice is a "claw".

References

External links 

 
"Santa Claws (1996)". JoBlo.
Harshcore, Rod (December 21, 2011). "Have A Holly Horror Christmas". Yell!
Pennington, Gail (December 7, 2012). "Ho-ho-horrors: Movies make Christmas a scary holiday".

1996 films
1996 horror films
1990s Christmas horror films
1990s slasher films
American slasher films
American Christmas horror films
Films about fandom
Films about stalking
1990s English-language films
1990s American films